Ndia or NDIA may refer to:
Ndia Constituency,  Kirinyaga District, Central Province, Kenya
Alternative name for the Southern Kirinyaga dialect of the Kikuyu language
National Defense Industrial Association, an American trade association 
National Digital Inclusion Alliance, an American non-profit organization
Hamad International Airport, an airport in Qatar, formerly known as New Doha International Airport
 N.D.Ia., an abbreviation used for the United States District Court for the Northern District of Iowa

See also
India